The 2008 All-Big 12 Conference football team consists of American football players chosen as All-Big 12 Conference players for the 2008 NCAA Division I FBS football season.  The conference recognizes two official All-Big 12 selectors: (1) the Big 12 conference coaches selected separate offensive and defensive units and named first- and second-team players (the "Coaches" team); and (2) a panel of sports writers and broadcasters covering the Big 12 also selected offensive and defensive units and named first- and second-team players (the "Media" team).

Offensive selections

Quarterbacks
 Sam Bradford, Oklahoma (Coaches-1; Media-1)
 Colt McCoy, Texas (Coaches-2; Media-2)

Running backs
 Kendall Hunter, Oklahoma State (Coaches-1; Media-1)
 DeMarco Murray, Oklahoma (Coaches-1; Media-2)
 Derrick Washington, Missouri (Coaches-2)
 Shannon Woods, Texas Tech (Coaches-2)

Offensive Line
 Jason Smith, Baylor (Coaches-1; Media-1)
 Phil Loadholt, Oklahoma (Coaches-1; Media-1)
 Duke Robinson, Oklahoma (Coaches-1; Media-1)
 Russell Okung, Oklahoma State (Coaches-1; Media-1)
 Jon Cooper, Oklahoma (Coaches-2; Media-1)
 Adam Ulatoski, Texas (Coaches-1; Media-2)
 Rylan Reed, Texas Tech (Coaches-2; Media-1)
 Trent Williams, Oklahoma (Coaches-1)
 Matt Slauson, Nebraska (Coaches-2; Media-2)
 Louis Vasquez, Texas Tech (Coaches-2; Media-2)
 Kurtis Gregory, Missouri (Coaches-2)
 Chris Hall, Texas (Coaches-2)

Tight ends
 Chase Coffman, Missouri (Coaches-2; Media-1)
 Jermaine Gresham, Oklahoma (Coaches-1; Media-2)

Receivers
 Michael Crabtree, Texas Tech (Coaches-1; Media-1)
 Dez Bryant, Oklahoma State (Coaches-1; Media-1)
 Jeremy Maclin, Missouri (Coaches-1; Media-1)
 Dezmon Briscoe, Kansas (Coaches-2; Media-2)
 Jordan Shipley, Texas (Coaches-2; Media-2)
 Quan Cosby, Texas (Media-2)
 Juaquin Iglesias, Oklahoma (Coaches-2)

Defensive selections

Defensive linemen

 Brian Orakpo,	Texas (Coaches-1; Media-1)
 Brandon Williams, Texas Tech (Coaches-1; Media-1)
 Jeremy Beal, Oklahoma (Coaches-2; Media-1)
 Gerald McCoy, Oklahoma (Coaches-1; Media-2)
 Roy Miller, Texas (Coaches-1; Media-2)
 Ndamukong Suh, Nebraska (Coaches-2; Media-1)
 Ziggy Hood, Missouri (Coaches-1)
 George Hypolite, Colorado (Coaches-2; Media-2)
 Stryker Sulak, Missouri (Coaches-2; Media-2)
 Ian Campbell, Kansas State (Coaches-2)

Linebackers
 Joe Pawelek, Baylor (Coaches-1; Media-1)
 Sean Weatherspoon, Missouri (Coaches-1; Media-1)
 Sergio Kindle, Texas (Coaches-1; Media-2)
 James Holt, Kansas (Coaches-2; Media-1)
 Travis Lewis, Oklahoma (Coaches-2; Media-1)
 Andre Sexton, Oklahoma State (Coaches-2; Media-2)
 Roddrick Muckelroy, Texas (Media-2)
 Jeff Smart, Colorado (Media-2)

Defensive backs

 Jordan Lake, Baylor (Coaches-1; Media-1)
 Darcel McBath, Texas Tech (Coaches-1; Media-1)
 Darrell Stuckey, Kansas (Coaches-1; Media-1)
 Daniel Charbonnet, Texas Tech (Coaches-2; Media-1)
 Nic Harris, Oklahoma (Coaches-1; Media-2)
 William Moore, Missouri (Coaches-1; Media-2)
 Dominique Franks, Oklahoma (Coaches-2; Media-2)
 Lendy Holmes, Oklahoma (Coaches-2; Media-2)
 Jacob Lacey, Oklahoma State (Coaches-2)
 Ryan Palmer, Texas (Coaches-2)

Special teams

Kickers

 Jeff Wolfert, Missouri (Coaches-1; Media-1)

Punters

 Justin Brantly, Texas A&M (Coaches-1; Media-1)
 Matt Fodge, Oklahoma State (Coaches-2; Media-2)

All-purpose / Return specialists

 Dez Bryant, Oklahoma State (Coaches-1)
 Jeremy Maclin, Missouri (Media-1)
 DeMarco Murray, Oklahoma (Media-2)
 Jordan Shipley, Texas (Coaches-2)

Key
Bold = selected as a first-team player by both the coaches and media panel

Coaches = selected by Big 12 Conference coaches

Media = selected by a media panel

See also
2008 College Football All-America Team

References

All-Big 12 Conference
All-Big 12 Conference football teams